Julie Uhrman is an American soccer executive and entrepreneur who is president of Angel City FC, a National Women's Soccer League team based in Los Angeles, California, that Uhrman also co-founded. She was previously an executive at Playboy Enterprises, Lionsgate Entertainment, IGN, and Vivendi Entertainment, and founded the former video game console company Ouya.

Angel City FC 

Uhrman co-founded Angel City FC with venture capitalist Kara Nortman of Upfront Ventures, and actress Natalie Portman. The NWSL club signed 21 sponsors and sold 14,300 season tickets before its first season of play, and attracted a $14 million investment round from numerous celebrities, including lead investor Alexis Ohanian. Nortman recruited Uhrman in 2019 from the pickup basketball league both women competed in and tasked her with building the team's business plan, despite Uhrman not previously knowing that the NWSL existed. The NWSL granted Uhrman's group an expansion team on July 21, 2020, for play in the 2022 NWSL season.

Personal life 
Uhrman was born and raised in Los Angeles, California. She has two children, Charlie and Elle.

References 

Living people
Year of birth missing (living people)
Angel City FC founders
National Women's Soccer League executives
American technology company founders
American technology chief executives